Raoul Barouch (born 12 May 1916) was a Tunisian fencer. He competed in the individual foil, sabre and épée events at the 1960 Summer Olympics.

References

External links
 

1916 births
Possibly living people
Tunisian male épée fencers
Olympic fencers of Tunisia
Fencers at the 1960 Summer Olympics
Sportspeople from Tunis
Tunisian male foil fencers
Tunisian male sabre fencers
20th-century Tunisian people